Constantin Mişelăricu (born 25 September 1989) is a Romanian professional footballer who plays as a defender.

External links

References

1989 births
Living people
Romanian footballers
FCV Farul Constanța players
FC Delta Dobrogea Tulcea players
ACF Gloria Bistrița players
ASC Oțelul Galați players
AFC Săgeata Năvodari players
FC Viitorul Constanța players
FC Petrolul Ploiești players
Association football defenders
People from Tulcea